Overall performance of East Timor in the Lusophony Games.

Medal table by sports

Participation by year 
 2006
 2009

References

E
East Timor at multi-sport events